Nepal Rastriya Bikas Party (translation: Nepal National Development Party) was a political party in Nepal, led by Takashi Miyahara.

References

Political parties in Nepal
Political parties established in 2006
2006 establishments in Nepal